The Confessional Evangelical Lutheran Church of Albania is a small Albanian national Lutheran church body that originated in the Wisconsin Evangelical Lutheran Synod's (WELS) missionary work. It is an associate member of the Confessional Evangelical Lutheran Conference.

The church body has 73 baptized members and two congregations in Tirana and Durrës. The average weekly attendance at worship services is 98. Agron Mece and Mikel Bishka served the church body as national evangelists since 2009, when the last WELS missionary returned to the United States. Work continued under overseeing and advising of WELS's local regional mission counselor. Mece and Bishka graduated as Bachelors of Divinity from St. Sophia Ukrainian Lutheran Theological Seminary in Ternopil, Ukraine, and they became the first national pastors. WELS does not have resident missionaries in its sister church, but it continues in providing encouragement and help in theological education and some financial support.

References

External links
WELS Mission Photos of Albania

Protestantism in Albania
 
Lutheranism in Europe